Atarsha (Atarşa) is a rural locality (a selo) and the administrative centre of Atarshinsky Selsoviet, Belokataysky District, Bashkortostan, Russia. The population was 375 as of 2010. There are 5 streets.

Geography 
Atarsha is located 13 km south of Novobelokatay (the district's administrative centre) by road. Verkhneutyashevo is the nearest rural locality.

References 

Rural localities in Belokataysky District